The Z Twins is a couple of radio stations owned by the Seattle Medium, an African American newspaper that serves the Seattle area:

 KRIZ 1420 AM
 KYIZ 1620 AM